Georges Vandenberghe (Oostrozebeke, 28 December 1941 — Bruges, 23 September 1983) was a professional Belgian cyclist.

Vandenberghe participated in 7 Tours de France between 1965 and 1971. His best tour was the 1968 Tour de France, where he wore the yellow jersey for 11 days, and finished 18th in the overall classification.

Major results

1961
Tour du Hainaut
1962
Omloop van de Westhoek
1963
Moorsele
Anzegem
Schoonaarde
Ruiselede
1964
Moorsele
Omloop der Zuid-West-Vlaamse Bergen
Volta a Portugal:
Winner 4 stages
Winner points classification
Westrozebeke
Sint-Andries
1966
Tour de France:
Winner stage 13
1967
Flèche Enghiennoise
Machelen
Ronde van Oost-Vlaanderen
Giro d'Italia:
Winner stage 13
1968
Assebroek
1970
GP du Tournaisis
1971
Sirault

External links 

Official Tour de France results for Georges Vandenberghe

1941 births
1983 deaths
Belgian male cyclists
Belgian Tour de France stage winners
Belgian Giro d'Italia stage winners
Cyclists from West Flanders
People from Oostrozebeke